This is a list of people from or associated with the city of Turin, Italy.

A 

 Adelaide of Susa (10161091), princess
 Africa Unite, musical group
 Piero Aggradi (1934-2008), footballer
 Andrea Agnelli (born 1975), president of Juventus
 Edoardo Agnelli (18921935), industrialist
 Gianni Agnelli (19212003), industrialist
 Giovanni Agnelli (18661945), industrialist
 Umberto Agnelli (19342004), industrialist
 Marisa Allasio (born 1936), actress
 Amadeo I of Spain (1845–1890), Italian prince, King of Spain, 1870 to 1873.
 Giuliano Amato (born 1938), politician
 Fausto Amodei (born 1935), singer-songwriter
 Felice Andreasi (19282005), actor
 Piero Angela (born 1928), journalist, television presenter, writer, popularizer of science
 Alessandro Antonelli (17981888), architect
 Giovanni Arpino (19271987), writer
 Guido Ascoli (18871957), mathematician
 Amedeo Avogadro (17761856), scientist.
 Gigi D'Agostino (born 1967), composer, singer, dj
 Massimo d’Azeglio (17981866), politician, writer, painter.

B 

 Cesare Balbo (17891853), writer and politician.
 Giacomo Balla (18711958), painter
 Franco Balmamion (born 1940), cyclist, two-times winner of the giro d’Italia
 Giuseppe Baretti (17191789), writer and critic.
 Alessandro Baricco (born 1958), writer
 Giambatista Beccaria (17161781), physicist
 Camillo Benso (18101861), Conte di Cavour, politician.
 Livio Berruti (born 1939), athlete
 Fausto Bertinotti (born 1940), politician and trade unionist
 Nuccio Bertone (19141997), automobile designer and constructor
 Roberto Bettega (born 1950), footballer, manager
 Carlo Biscaretti di Ruffia (1879–1959), founder of an automobile museum
 Norberto Bobbio (19092004), philosopher
 Giorgio Bocca (19202011), partisan, journalist, writer
 Alessio Boggiatto (born 1981), swimmer
 Ernesto Bonino (19222008), singer
 Giampiero Boniperti (1928–2021), footballer, manager
 Bartolomeo Bosco (17931863), illusionist
 Giovanni Bosco (18151888), saint and founder of the Salesians
 Carlo Bossoli (18151884), painter
 Arturo Brachetti (born 1967), quick-change artist
 Mercedes Bresso (born 1944), politician
 Benedetto Brin (1833–1898), naval administrator and politician.
 Carla Bruni (born 1968), model, singer
 Fred Buscaglione (19211960), singer

C 

 Giuseppe Cafasso (18111860), saint
 Athanase-Charles-Marie Charette de la Contrie (18321911), general, French royalist and ubiquitous military commander
 Italo Calvino (19231985), writer
 Mauro German Camoranesi (born 1976), footballer
 Gaspare Campari (18281882), inventor of the drink Campari
 Carlo Alberto (17981849), King of Sardinia.
 Alfredo Casella (18831947), composer & musician
 Valentino Castellani (born 1940), mayor and director of the Olympic committee
 Felice Casorati (18831963), painter
 Giorgio Ceragioli (19302008), engineer
 Giuseppe Cerutti (1738–1792), a French-Italian author and politician.
 Luigi Palma di Cesnola (1832–1904), soldier, diplomat and archaeologist.
 Cristina Chiabotto (born 1986), Miss Italia, television presenter
 Piero Chiambretti (born 1956), television presenter
 Sergio Chiamparino (born 1948), mayor of Turin
 Guido Chiesa (born 1959), director
 Francesco Cirio (18361900), entrepreneur
 Gustavo Colonnetti (18861968), mathematician and engineer
 Gianpiero Combi (19021956), footballer; goalkeeper for the Italian team which won the World Cup in 1934
 Giovanni Conso (19222015), jurist and politician
 Giuseppe Benedetto Cottolengo (17861842), saint and founder of the Piccola Casa della Divina Provvidenza
 Roberto Cravero (born 1964), footballer
 Leon Croizat (18941982), scientist

D 
 Luigi Ferdinando Dagnese, novelist

E 

 Umberto Eco (19322016), writer
 Eiffel 65, musical group
 Antonella Elia (born 1963), actress, television presenter
 Giulio Einaudi (19121999), editor, founder of the publishers Einaudi
 Luigi Einaudi (18741961), economist, politician, President of the Republic
 Ludovico Einaudi (born 1955), musician, composer
 Emanuele Filiberto (15281580), Duke of Savoy.

F 

 Francesco Faà di Bruno (18251888), army officer, scientist, mathematician and priest
 Giorgio Faletti (19502014), comic, writer
 Ugo Fano (19122001), scientist
 Giuseppe Farina (19061966), pilot, Formula 1 world champion
 Battista Farina (18931966), entrepreneur
 Piero Fassino (born 1949), politician
 Beppe Fenoglio (19221963), writer
 Giuliano Ferrara (born 1952), journalist and politician
 Davide Ferrario (born 1956), film director
 Galileo Ferraris (18471897), scientist
 Lorenzo Ferrero (born 1951), composer
 Pietro Ferrero (18981949), entrepreneur
 Nunzio Filogamo (19022002), the first Italian radio and television presenter
Giorgia Fiorio (born 1967), photographer
 Luigi Firpo (19151989), historian
 Vittorio Foa (19102008), politician
 Pier Giorgio Frassati (19011926), Roman Catholic saint
 Massimiliano Frezzato (born 1967), comic book author
 Carlo Fruttero (19262012), writer
 Guido Fubini (18791943), mathematician
 Margherita Fumero (born 1947), television comic and theatrical actor

G 

 Giuseppe Gabrielli (19031987), scientist
 Ricardo Galeazzi (1866-1952), Surgeon
 Luciano Gallino (19272015), sociologist
 Sonia Gandhi (born 1946), politician
 Gabriel Garko (born 1974), actor
 Stanislao Gastaldon (18611939), composer
 Giacinto Ghia (18871944), coachbuilder
 Giuseppe Giacosa (18471906), poet, playwright, and librettist
 Massimo Giletti (born 1962), television presenter
 Natalia Ginzburg (19161991), writer
 Vincenzo Gioberti (18011852), philosopher and politician.
 Giovanni Giolitti (18421928), politician
 Sebastian Giovinco (born 1987), footballer
 Piero Gobetti (19011926), politician
 Cesare Goffi (19201995), professional footballer
 Guido Gozzano (18831916), poet
 Arturo Graf (18481913), poet and literary historian.
 Antonio Gramsci (18911937), politician, writer
 Piero Gros (born 1954), sciatore
 Count Angelo De Gubernatis (1840–1913), man of letters.
 Guarino Guarini (16241683), architect
 Ambra Gutierrez (born 1992), model

I 

 Massimo Introvigne (born 1955), attorney and founder of the Center for Studies on New Religions

J 

 Giacomo Jaquerio (c. 1380–1453), painter
 Filippo Juvarra (16781736), architect

L 

 Alberto La Marmora (17881863), general, politician.
 Joseph Louis Lagrange (Giuseppe Lodovico Lagrangia) (17361813), mathematician.
 Vincenzo Lancia (18811937), industrialist
 Luigi Lavazza (18591949), founder of the Lavazza coffee manufacturers
 Gad Lerner (born 1954), journalist
 Gabriella Lettini (born 1968), Waldensian pastor, ethicist, and feminist theologian
 Carlo Levi (19021975), writer, painter
 Primo Levi (19191987), chemist, writer
 Rita Levi Montalcini (19092012), biologist, senator for life, Nobel prizewinner
 Luciana Littizzetto (born 1964), actress
 Cesare Lombroso (18351909), scientist
 Marie Thérèse Louise of Savoy (1749–1792), Princesse de Lamballe, House of Savoy.
 Franco Lucentini (19202002), writer
 Salvador Luria (19121991), scientist, Nobel prizewinner

M 

 Erminio Macario (19021980), actor
 Marco Maccarini (born 1976), television presenter
 Joseph de Maistre (17531821), lawyer, diplomat, writer, and philosopher.
 Claudio Marchisio (born 1986), footballer
 Carlo Marochetti  RA (1805–1867), an Italian-born French sculptor.
 Enrico Martino, photojournalist
 Mau Mau, band
 Ezio Mauro (born 1948), journalist, current editor of La Repubblica
 Maximus of Turin (c. 380c. 465), saint and father of the Church; the first known bishop of Turin
 Ugo Martinat (19422009), politician 
 Sandro Mazzola (born 1942), footballer
 Valentino Mazzola (19191949), footballer
 Juste-Aurèle Meissonier (1695–1750), goldsmith, sculptor and furniture designer.
 Luigi Meroni (19431967), footballer
 Mario Merz (19252003), artist
 Pietro Micca (16771706), soldier.
 Gianni Minà (born 1938), journalist
 Luciano Moggi (born 1937), director of Juventus F.C.
 Carlo Mollino (19051973), architect
 Luca Cordero di Montezemolo (born 1947), entrepreneur
 Franco Morzone (born 1918), footballer
 Leonardo Murialdo (18281900), saint

N 

 Giulio Natta (19031979), chemist, Nobel prizewinner
 Cesare Nay (19251994), footballer
 Ugo Nespolo (born 1941), painter

P 

 Giancarlo Pajetta (19111990), politician
 Vilfredo Pareto (18481923), sociologist, economist and philosopher
 Alba Parietti (born 1961), television presenter
 Carlo Parola (19212000), footballer
 Giovanni Pastrone (18831959), director
 Giuseppe Patrucco (born 1932), retired footballer
 Cesare Pavese (19081950), writer
 Rita Pavone (born 1945), singer
 Giuseppe Peano (18581932), mathematician
 Giuseppe Pellizza da Volpedo (18681907), painter
 Carlo Petrini (born 1949), founder of the International Slow Food Movement
 Fabrizio Pinelli (born 1985), footballer
 Sergio Pininfarina (19262012), entrepreneur, senator for life
 Gilberto Pogliano (born 1908), former professional footballer
 Gabry Ponte (born 1973), DJ and member of Eiffel 65 
 Vittorio Pozzo (18861968), football coach; coach for the Italian team which won the World Cup in 1934 and 1938
 Carola Prosperi (1883 – 1981), writer, feminist and journalist
 Gaetano Pugnani (17311798), violinist and composer

Q 

 Lidia Quaranta (18911928), actress

R 

 Carol Rama (19182015), artist
 Tullio Regge (19312014), scientist, Albert Einstein Medal recipient
 Righeira, music duo
 Johnson Righeira (born 1960), singer, songwriter, musician, record producer, actor
 Michael Righeira (born 1961), singer, songwriter, musician, actor
 Marco Rizzo (born 1959), politician
 Stefania Rocca (born 1971), actress
 Gianni Rodari (19201980), writer
 Medardo Rosso (18581928), sculptor

S 

 Emilio Salgari (18621911), writer
 Giuseppe Saragat (18981988), politician, President of the Republic
 Massimo Scaglione (1931–2015), director
 Gaetano Scirea (19531989), footballer
 Quintino Sella (18271884), politician, entrepreneur.
 Dani Sénna (born 1991), footballer
 Andrea Laszlo De Simone (born 1986), musician
 Leone Sinigaglia (18681944), composer, mountaineer
 Ascanio Sobrero (18121888), chemist, discovered Nitroglycerin.
 Mario Soldati (19061999), writer, director
 Germain Sommeiller (18151871), civil engineer
 Piero Sraffa (18981983), economist
 Subsonica, rock band

T 

 Francesco Tamagno (18501905), operatic tenor
 Teresina Tua (18661956), violinist
 Armando Testa (19171992), graphic artist
 Umberto Tozzi (born 1952), singer
 Marco Travaglio (born 1964), journalist
 Alex Treves (19292020), Italian-born American Olympic fencer
 Emma Turolla (18581943), operatic soprano

U 

 Umberto I (18441900), King of Italy.

V 

 Raf Vallone (19162002), footballer, partisan, journalist and stage and screen actor
 Ferruccio Valobra (18981944, soldier, antifascist and partisan
 Cristina Vane, country blues singer, guitarist, banjoist and songwriter
 Gianni Vattimo (born 1936), philosopher and politician
 Simona Ventura (born 1965), television presenter
 Luciano Violante (born 1941), politician
 Vittorio Amedeo I (15871637), Duke of Savoy.
 Vittorio Amedeo II (16661732), King of Sardinia.
 Vittorio Emanuele II (18201878), King of Italy.

W 

 William VII of Montferrat (c. 12401292), Marquess

References

 
People
Turin